"If You Still Want a Fool Around" is a song recorded by American country music artist Charley Pride.  It was released in July 1987 as the second single from the album After All This Time.  The song reached #31 on the Billboard Hot Country Singles & Tracks chart.  The song was written by Kent Robbins.

Chart performance

References

1987 singles
1987 songs
Charley Pride songs
Songs written by Kent Robbins
16th Avenue Records singles